The February 1880 Liverpool by-election was fought on 6 February 1880.  The byelection was fought due to the death of the incumbent Conservative MP, John Torr.  It was won by the Conservative candidate Edward Whitley.

References

1880 elections in the United Kingdom
1880 in England
1880s in Liverpool
Liverpoool, 1880